Katharina (minor planet designation: 320 Katharina) is a small Main belt asteroid orbiting in the Eos family of asteroids, including 513 Centesima and 221 Eos. It was discovered by Johann Palisa on 11 October 1891 in Vienna. It is named after the discoverer's mother.

References

External links 
 
 

000320
Discoveries by Johann Palisa
Named minor planets
18911011